Four-time defending champion David Wagner and his partner Andrew Lapthorne defeated Dylan Alcott and Heath Davidson in the final, 6–3, 6–3 to win the quad doubles wheelchair tennis title at the 2017 Australian Open.

Lucas Sithole and Wagner were the reigning champions, but Sithole did not participate this year, as he was ranked outside the world's top 3 and did not receive the event's wildcard.

Seeds

Draw

References
 Main Draw 

Wheelchair Quad Doubles
2017 Quad Doubles